Goggi is an Italian surname. Notable people with the surname include:
 Emilia Goggi (1817–1857), Italian operatic mezzo-soprano
 Loretta Goggi (born 1950), Italian singer and actress
  (born 1953), Italian singer and actor
 Georg Holm Goggi

Italian-language surnames